Islam in the Modern World: Challenged by the West, Threatened by Fundamentalism, Keeping Faith with Tradition is a 2012 book by the Iranian philosopher Seyyed Hossein Nasr.

References

Sources

 

Seyyed Hossein Nasr
Books about Islam